Shuiche Town is an urban town in Xinhua County, Hunan Province, People's Republic of China.

Administrative division
The town is divided into 35 villages and one community:

Zique Community (紫鹊社区)
Shuiche Village (水车村)
Qingjiang Village (清江村)
Fuzhu Village (扶竹村)
Zhile Village (直乐村)
Shihe Village (石禾村)
Changshi Village (长石村)
Gucheng Village (古城村)
Gonghe Village (共和村)
Tangjia Village (塘家村)
Louxia Village (楼下村)
Datong Village (大同村)
Huanglong Village (黄龙村)
Dongxi Village (东溪村)
Mojia Village (莫家村)
Xianshi Village (仙石村)
Chongyang Village (崇阳村)
Jianguo Village (建国村)
Sanjiao Village (三角村)
Daoguan Village (道观村)
Shangxi Village (上溪村)
Tianjia Village (田家村)
Jishan Village (吉山村)
Mijia Village (米家村)
Xixi Village (锡溪村)
Fengjia Village (奉家村)
Baishui Village (白水村)
Longpu Village (龙普村)
hifeng Village (石丰村)
Laozhuang Village (老庄村)
inlong Village (金龙村)
Longxiang Village (龙湘村)
Zhenglong Village (正龙村)
Baiyuan Village (白源村)
Liushuang Village (柳双村)
Jingzhu Village (荆竹村)

References

Divisions of Xinhua County